is a national park in Kagoshima Prefecture, Japan.
The national park includes areas of these islands: Tokunoshima, Kikai, Amami, Yoron, Okinoerabujima, Uke Island, Kakeromajima and Yoroshima.

History 

On 15 February 1974 the Amami Guntō Quasi-National Park was founded on Amami Ōshima. On 7 March 2017 the Amami Guntō National Park was established and it subsumed the former Amami Guntō Quasi-National Park. The Amami Guntō National Park includes parts of the municipalities of Amagi, Amami, China, Isen, Kikai, Setouchi, Tatsugō, Tokunoshima, Uken, Wadomari, Yamato, and Yoron.

The designation of the new National Park, alongside that of Yanbaru National Park, is part of the movement to have Amami-Oshima Island, Tokunoshima Island, the northern part of Okinawa Island and Iriomote Island inscribed on the UNESCO World Heritage List.

The Amami Wildlife Center is managed by Japan's Ministry of the Environment to protect and preserve the natural ecosystem of the Amami Islands.

Geography

It is a World Heritage Site candidate. The national park consists of areas from these islands: Tokunoshima, Kikai, Amami, Yoron, Okinoerabujima, Uke Island, Kakeromajima and Yoroshima.

Flora and fauna

This national park features coral reefs, mangrove forests and tidal flats. A unique ecosystem has developed with endemic species such as the Amami rabbit, Ryukyu spiny rat, birds: Amami's jay, Ryukyu robin. There are also snakes such as Habu and amphibians such as: Ishikawa's frog, Japanese warty newt and the Ryūkyū scops owl.

Amami Ōshima, Kakeromajima
Yuwandake is covered with subtropical hardwood forests such as Castanopsis sieboldii and Neolitsea aciculata and it has valuable vegetation. There are coral reefs, mangrove forests at the mouth of the Katsushi River and underwater scenery.

Kikaijima
Noticeable coastal terraces are distributed on the islands. Hyakunodai Park is a plateau where coral reefs have developed.

Tokunoshima
This is a limestone island with a Karst topography. There is a natural Sea cave created by erosion. Mt. Inokawa is known as a treasure of endemic plants including ferns.

Okinoerabujima
There are large-scale caves such as the Shoryu Cavern and a water tunnel. Sea cliffs developed in the area of Minamata and Kunigamizaki.

Yoronjima
The entire coast is designated as part of the national park except for the area around Yoron Airport. Coral reefs surround the island.

Gallery

See also
 List of national parks of Japan
 List of World Heritage Sites in Japan
 Amami rabbit
 Amami Ōshima

References

External links
  Map of Amami Guntō National Park

National parks of Japan
Parks and gardens in Kagoshima Prefecture
Protected areas established in 2017
2017 establishments in Japan